T. J. Hooker is an American police drama television series starring William Shatner in the title role as a 15-year veteran police sergeant. The series premiered as a mid-season replacement on March 13, 1982, on ABC and ran on the network until May 4, 1985. The show was then picked up for a further single season by CBS.

Shout! Factory acquired the DVD rights and released a box set of all five seasons on July 18, 2017.

Series overview

Episodes

Season 1 (1982)

Season 2 (1982–83)
Introduced at the start of the second season was attractive Officer Stacy Sheridan (Heather Locklear), the daughter of Captain Sheridan who attended the police academy and replaced Vicki (April Clough).

Season 3 (1983–84)
The third season saw a slight revamp (including the theme music being rearranged into a more pop-driven version), with James Darren promoted to series regular in the credits, and Richard Herd appearing as 'Special Guest Star' in six third-season episodes and three in the fourth season.

Season 4 (1984–85)

Season 5 (1985–86)
Zmed departed from T. J. Hooker in 1985 when the show moved to CBS, choosing instead to replace Deney Terrio as host of Dance Fever for the final two seasons of the syndicated series' run following Terrio's departure.

References

External links
 
 

T. J. Hooker